Indochine is a French pop rock and new wave band formed in Paris in 1981. They became very successful in the Francophonie, Europe and Latin America in the 1980s, with songs like "L'Aventurier" and "Canary Bay". Following the release of several critically acclaimed, but commercially unsuccessful, albums in the 1990s, the group returned to stardom with the release of Paradize in 2002. The band has sold over 13 million albums and singles.

History

1980s 
Indochine (French for Indochina) was formed in 1981 by two Frenchmen in their early twenties, Nicola Sirkis and Dominique Nicolas, in Paris. They soon added Dimitri Bodiansky, the cousin of one of Nicola's friends.

They gave their first concert at Le Rose Bonbon, a café in Paris on 29 September 1981. This brief performance on stage earned them their first contract with a record company.

They recorded their first single in November 1981. It included two songs, "Dizzidence Politik" and "Françoise", but drew more attention from critics than from the mainstream media and only reached a limited audience.

Stéphane Sirkis, Nicola's twin brother who had already performed with the band on stage, officially joined the band, and in April 1982 the group recorded their first album, L'Aventurier, which sold more than 250,000 copies. The album was well received by the press and by an emerging new wave audience.

L'aventurier is the song of the summer 1982 in France.

In 1983, Indochine released a second album entitled Le Péril Jaune ("Yellow Peril") which sold 225,000 copies. Indochine had by this stage become a major act in French music. In 1984, the band toured France. They were also successful in Scandinavia, most notably in Sweden.

By 1985, they had achieved a large following, reflected by the success of such songs as "Troisième sexe" ("third sex"), "Canary Bay", and "Trois nuits par semaine". Their third album, 3, sold 750,000 copies in Europe. Serge Gainsbourg directed the video to "Tes yeux noirs", one of the group's most successful songs.

Indochine becomes the largest "new wave" band in France. The single "L'Aventurier" won the French awards "bus d'acier 1983".

In 1986, to celebrate the fifth anniversary of the band, Indochine decided to release the recording of the concert given at the Zénith in Paris.

Their fourth album, 7000 Danses, produced by Joe Glasman, was released in 1987. It sold about 320,000 copies making it a successful album though far less so than its predecessor, 3. This is partly due to the band's efforts to produce a less mainstream, commercial album. 7000 Danses was also released amidst a controversy stemming from rock critics claiming that Indochine were a mere copy of British band The Cure. In spite of the controversy fans continued to support the group.

1988 Tour 

Starting in 1986 the band gained a following in Lima, Peru as a result of the radio broadcast of their 'L'Aventurier' single.  Then, in early 1987, the small record label, El Virrey, negotiated the rights to the 'Au Zénith' album, which it released as 33 rpm LP and on cassette tape.

Surprised by this development, Indochine decided to add a stop in Lima after their transatlantic debut in Montreal. Following their appearance in Montreal on 6 April 1988, the band traveled to Peru. There, they performed before their Lima fans in four shows, on 29 and 30 April, and on 6 and 7 May 1988, at the Coliseo Amauta, reaching a total audience of over 40,000 people. In that period the band sold some 400,000 recordings in Peru.

That was the only Indochine tour in the late 1980s. For this tour the quartet had the participation of guest musicians such as Diego Burgard (Bass) and Jean-My Truong (Drums), a documentary about the tour was filmed in different cities in Europe, Canada and Peru and it was released for sale on VHS tape in 1989.

1990s 
Drained after many months touring, the band took a break. Their fifth studio album, Le Baiser, was released in early 1990. Fans were shocked to discover that Dimitri Bodiansky was no longer part of the group, having decided to leave the band in January 1989 . His departure can be attributed to a number of reasons. First of all, Indochine's sound had evolved over the years and Bodiansky found he had less and less to do as a saxophonist. He was also feeling pressure at home having recently become a father. All this contributed to tension between him and the rest of the band. Bodiansky remains a much loved member of the original Indochine line-up and since his departure has guest starred with the band on stage.

1991 marked Indochine's tenth anniversary. To celebrate the occasion, Le Birthday Album was released. It was a best of compilation, including one new track, "La Guerre Est Finie" ("The War Is Over"), which was released as a single. The album's success was considerable (it sold 600,000 copies across Europe) and rekindled interest in the group. However, the single's title proved unfortunate in light of the fact that the Persian Gulf War had just started at the time. For this reason, many radio stations opted not to play the track.

Un jour dans notre vie, their sixth studio album, was released in 1993. It proved unsuccessful, both commercially and critically.

"Un jour dans notre vie" wins French awards " video clip fantastique Gerardmer 1994"

On 27 February 1999, Stéphane Sirkis, guitarist, keyboardist and Nicola's twin brother, died at the age of 39 of hepatitis. He had requested that the band continue after his death.

2000s 

On October 2000, the band started a small but successful acoustic tour named Nuits Intimes. The album is released in January 2001.

2001 begins. Nicola and Oli de Sat compose most of the album Paradize that would be released the next year. Year Scott, Camille Laurens, Mickey 3D, Gerard Manset, Jean-Louis Murat and Melissa Auf Der Maur collaborated on the album.

In 2002, they enjoyed renewed success with the Paradize album which sold 1,000,000 copies, including the chart topper J'ai demandé à la lune.This album has marked a change in aesthetics and genre, moving towards a darker tone and more introspective lyrics, influenced by popular acts such as Nine Inch Nails, Placebo and Marilyn Manson.

In 2003, the band received the MTV Europe Music Awards for: "Best French Act", the NRJ Music Awards for: "Album of the year" and La Victoires de la Musique for: "Best pop album of the year"

In December 2005, Indochine returned with Alice & June, featuring a collaboration with Placebo frontman Brian Molko. On 6 and 7 June 2006, the group had a concert in Hanoi Opera House to celebrate their 25th anniversary.

In December 2007, Indochine released a triple live DVD and double CD album entitled Alice & June Tour.  The album featured the full concert recorded in Lille, France in March 2007.

In 2008 Indochine joins the Reporters Sans Frontières campaign, for the boycott of the Beijing Olympic Games's opening ceremony. The cover of the 80's single 'You Spin me Round' is released (all the collected founds were entirely given to RSF).

Their 11th studio album, La République des Meteors, was released on 9 March 2009. The album marked a change in their musical style, slowly moving away from the dark and quirky realms they had explored with "Paradize" and "Alice & June".

2010s 
Indochine was the first French band to perform at the Stade de France, on 26 June 2010 their biggest gig ever, sold out and in front of 80,000 people.

In November 2012, the band released their new single Memoria, from their upcoming album Black City Parade.

Black City Parade was released on 11 February 2013 with much anticipation from the fans. The album, despite its almost gloomy cover art, features much brighter and warmer music than the last two albums. The band seemed to want include references to their synthpop and new wave beginnings.
Indochine played several sold-out shows during the first leg of the "Black City Tour" which kicked off on 21 February 2013. Five legs are planned for the "Black City Tour". The band stated that they will be playing around the world. They later announced that they will return to the Stade de France on 27 June 2014.

The second single for Black City Parade was College Boy, a song widely acknowledged to narrate the life of a homosexual teenage boy dealing with bashing and harassment. The video for the single was directed by Canadian filmmaker Xavier Dolan. The video premiered online with a disclaimer stating that it contained violent scenes and would not be suitable for a young audience. The video depicts a young male student facing mobbing and harassment from his schoolmates. The video culminates in him being brutally crucified and shot in the torso by his fellow students. Many criticisms have poured over the Internet about whether the video should be broadcast or not.

The band played two nights at the Stade de France on 27 & 28 June 2014.  They followed the stadium concerts with a much smaller show at London's O2 Shepherd's Bush Empire on 14 July 2014.

In April 2015, the band undertook the eight dates Europe City Club Tour, which saw the band extend beyond its Francophone base by visiting Spain, Germany, Sweden, Denmark, Norway and the Netherlands.

2016 was the year of The Festival Tours with performances at Papillons De Nuit (20 May), Les Ardentes (6 July), Carcassonne festival (15 July), Sion Sous Les Etoiles (18 July), Poupet (22 July), La Fête Du Bruit (12 August) and Cabaret Vert (25 August).

Their 13th album, named 13 (2017) had a big success in France, with singles like Un été français or La vie est belle.

In 2020 the band announced a new tour to come in 2021 to celebrate their 40 years of career, the Central Tour, with 5 dates in the biggest French stadiums, making their 4th Stade de France.

Band members 
Current Members
 Nicola Sirkis (vocals, guitar, synthesizer and harmonica, from 1981 until present)
 Marc Eliard (bass since 1992)
 Boris Jardel (lead guitar since 1998)
 oLi dE SaT (Olivier Gérard) (keyboards and rhythm guitar since 1999)
 Ludwig Dahlberg (drums since 2015)

Past Members
 Stéphane Sirkis (guitar and keyboards from 1982 to 1999 → death)
 Dominique Nicolas (guitar from 1981 until 1994)
 Dimitri Bodiansky (saxophone from 1981 until 1988)
 Arnaud Devos (drums from 1985 until 1986)
 Diego Burgar (bass from 1988 until 1992)
 Jean-My Truong (drums from 1988 until 1994)
 Didier Petitbeure (timbarde in 2002)
 Philippe Eidel (accordion in 1992)
 Jean Pierre Pilot (keyboards from 1994 until 2001)
 Alexandre Azaria (guitar from 1995 until 1997)
 Monsieur Tox (guitar from 1996 until 1997)
 Monsieur Yann (drums from 1996 until 1998)
 Matthieu Rabaté (drums from 1999 until 2002)
 Monsieur Frédéric (Frédéric Helbert) (keyboards from 2002 until 2004)
 Mr Shoes (François Soulier) (drums from 2002 until 2015)
 Mr Matu (Francois Matuszenski) (Keyboards from 2005 until 2015)

Discography 

L'aventurier (1982)
Le péril jaune (1983)
3 (1985)
7000 danses (1987)
Le baiser (1990)
Un jour dans notre vie (1993)
Wax (1996)
Dancetaria (1999)
Paradize (2002)
Alice & June (2005)
La république des meteors (2009)
Black City Parade (2013)
13 (2017)

Biography 
 Indochine (1986) by Jean-Eric Perrin
 Le Septennat (1988) by Marc Thirion
 Indochine de A à Z (2003) by Sébastien Bataille
 L'Aventure Indochine (2004) by Christian English and Frédéric Thibaud
 Insolence Rock (2004) by Sébastien Michaud
 Le Roman Vrai d'Indochine  (2005) by Jean-Claude Perrier
 Sur la Muraille d'Indochine  (2007) by Phillipe Crocq
 Indochine Story  (2009) by Anouk Vincent
 Kissing my song  (2011) by Agnès Michaux

References

External links 

 Official Indochine website
 Biography of Indochine, from Radio France Internationale

French new wave musical groups
French rock music groups
Ariola Records artists
Musical groups established in 1981
Musical groups from Paris
MTV Europe Music Award winners